The Georgia, Florida and Alabama Railroad (the GF&A), known as the Sumatra Leaf Route, and colloquially as the Gopher, Frog & Alligator was a -long railroad from Richland, Georgia to Carrabelle, Florida. It was founded in 1895 as a logging railroad, the Georgia Pine Railway. 

The northern and southern ends of the railroad have been abandoned, but the section from Cuthbert, Georgia, to Tallahassee, Florida, remains in use by various railroads.

History

Construction and early years

Hannibal Kimball promoted the Bainbridge, Cuthbert and Columbus Railroad to run north-to-south through southwest Georgia in 1869. Although work began on construction in 1870, it was never completed, and in 1872 the project was abandoned amidst financial problems and bond endorsement issues that stirred allegations of impropriety against Kimball. During the 1880s, attempts were made to revive the railroad, with some activity taking place in the middle of that decade, but this too came to nothing.

Finally, in 1895 local entrepreneur J. D. Williams laid rails on part of the route creating the Georgia Pine Railroad connecting Bainbridge to Arlington.  The railroad had only been intended for logging, but since it provided an additional rail route from Georgia into Florida and connected with other railroads, traffic increased. By 1898, the railroad was renamed the Georgia Florida and Alabama Railroad and by 1901, it had been extended north to Richland. In 1902, the GF&A completed the section from Tallahassee to Bainbridge.

Tallahassee to Carrabelle

In 1906, the Georgia Florida and Alabama Railway purchased the Carrabelle, Tallahassee & Georgia Railroad (CT&G), which ran from Tallahassee south to Carrabelle on the Gulf of Mexico.  The CT&G from Carrabelle north was first chartered as the Thomasville, Tallahassee and Gulf Railroad in 1883.  Construction began from Carrabelle to the Sopchoppy River, but it stopped there since the company could not obtain funding to build a bridge over the river.

The line was reorganized as the Augusta, Tallahassee and Gulf Railroad in 1889.  It was then purchased by William Clark who owned 175,000 acres of pine lands near the railroad.  Clark reincorporated the line as the Carrabelle, Tallahassee & Georgia Railroad on January 5, 1891.  Construction was complete to Tallahassee by October 1893.

CT&G also had stops at Hilliardville, Crawfordville, MacIntyre, and Lanark (site of an elegant casino/hotel).  From Carrabelle, the paddle steamer Crescent City, owned by the CT&G, made daily round trips to Apalachicola, to which there was no road or rail access at the time.

Once the Georgia Florida and Alabama Railroad acquired the CT&G, the GF&A reached its greatest extent from Richland, Georgia to Carrabelle, Florida, a distance of 180 miles.

Later Years
The GF&A was leased to the Seaboard Air Line Railway in 1927. The Seaboard went into receivership at the end of 1930, and the lease was revoked in 1931. The Seaboard was reformed after receiving government loans, and it agreed to operate, but not lease the GF&A.  In 1944, the court that was overseeing the Seaboard's receivership authorized the company to purchase 90% of the GF&A's bonds.

In 1948, the line was abandoned from Carrabelle to Tallahassee.

The Seaboard Air Line became part of CSX Transportation by 1980. In 1983, the former GF&A line north of Bainbridge was sold off to the South Carolina Central Railroad, and in 1989 it became part of the Georgia Southwestern Railroad. In 1997, the portion of the GF&A route from Richland south to Cuthbert was abandoned, and in 2002 the Georgia Department of Transportation acquired the remaining Cuthbert to Bainbridge section. The Georgia Southwestern remains the operator of the line.

Route 
The northern terminus of the line was at Richland, where it met the Savannah, Americus and Montgomery Railway and the Columbus Southern Railway. It ran almost due south through Cuthbert and Edison to reach Arlington, where it crossed the Central of Georgia Railway. It continued through Colquitt and Bainbridge before crossing the Flint river and entering Florida. It continued through Sopchoppy and Tallahassee and on to its southern terminus in Carrabelle on the Florida Gulf Coast.

Today 
The Cuthbert-Bainbridge segment is now owned by the Georgia Department of Transportation and operated by the Georgia Southwestern Railroad. 

The segment from Bainbridge to Attapulgus, Georgia, is owned by CSX.  It operates as their Bainbridge Subdivision. 

The Attapulgus-Tallahassee segment is owned by the Florida Gulf & Atlantic Railroad. 

Currently, the line's milepost numbers begin in Tallahassee at 52 and increase from there. This is due to the fact that the numbering still reflects the line's full length to Carrabelle, which was mile 0 before the track between there and Tallahassee was abandoned. 

A 2.4-mile part of the abandoned Tallahassee-Carrabelle segment of the GF&A is now the Tallahassee-Georgia Florida and Alabama (GF&A) Trail in the Apalachicola National Forest. Research work on the rail-to-trail project was done by Genesis Group.

Historic stations

Notes

References

External links
 "Georgia, Florida and Alabama Railway in Seaboard Air Line Railway: Steam Boats, Locomotives, and History by Richard E. Prince, 1966; reprinted 2000.
 "The Story of the Georgia Florida and Alabama RR" by Donald R. Hensley, Jr., at Taplines.net - includes a good map of the GF&A prior to its acquisition by the Seaboard in 1927.

Defunct railroad companies of the United States
American companies established in 1895
American companies disestablished in 1944
Defunct Florida railroads
1895 establishments in Florida
Defunct Georgia (U.S. state) railroads
Railway companies established in 1895
Railway companies disestablished in 1944
Predecessors of the Seaboard Air Line Railroad
Predecessors of CSX Transportation